Barney Point is a beachside suburb of Gladstone in the Gladstone Region, Queensland, Australia. In the  Barney Point had a population of 1,065 people.

Geography
Barney Point is bounded by the Coral Sea to the north and east and the North Coast railway line to the Port of Gladstone on the west. The northern part of the suburb is industrial, being port facilities. The southern part of the suburb is residential with a sandy beach and parkland by the sea.

There are four railway stations in the suburb on North Coast line serving the port area:

 South Gladstone railway station
 Barney Point railway station
 Gladstone railway station
 Auckland Point railway station

Gladstone railway station is the only station that is a passenger stop.

History
The area takes its name from the local headland Barney Point, which in turn was named in honour of George Barney (1792-1862), a soldier and engineer, and Lieutenant Governor of the Colony of North Australia 1846-1847.

A post office was opened on 1 September 1954 and closed on 8 March 1966.

In the 2011 census, Barney Point had a population of 1,156 people.

In the  Barney Point had a population of 1,093 people.

The  revealed that the population of Barney Point was 1,065 people.

Heritage listings
Barney Point has a number of heritage-listed sites, including:
 Friend Street: Friend Park

Education

Attractions
The Gladstone Maritime Museum presents maritime history of Port Curtis and the discovery, exploration and settlement of the region. It is located at 1 Francis Ward Drive.

Amenities
The Yaralla Sports Club at the corner of Bell and Wood Streets was first established in 1966 and provides sporting facilities, meals and entertainment. There is an on-site hotel. The club provides training and apprenticeships in tourism and hospitality through the Central Queensland Tourism and Hospitality Academy.

References

External links 

Suburbs of Gladstone
Gladstone Region